The Monroes is a Western television series which originally aired on ABC during the 1966–67 season.

Premise
The series centered on five orphans trying to survive as a family on the frontier in the area around what is now Grand Teton National Park near Jackson, Wyoming.  Their parents die in an accident in the first episode, and they try to carry on without them.

The orphans were helped by a Native American friend named Jim. Their neighbor was Major Mapoy, a British cattle baron who wanted the Monroes' land. However he relented and allowed the Monroe to remain, after learning that their father staked a claim before the major’s arrival in the area. Major Mapoy had his men build a house for the orphans, and he became a good neighbor.

Cast

Starring
Michael Anderson Jr. as eldest brother, Clay Monroe
Barbara Hershey as eldest sister, Kathy Monroe
Keith Schultz as Jefferson "Big Twin" Monroe
Kevin Schultz as Fenimore "Little Twin" Monroe
Tammy Locke as youngest sibling, Amy Monroe

Recurring
Ron Soble as Dirty Jim (19 episodes)
Liam Sullivan as Major Mapoy (17 episodes)
Ben Johnson as Sleeve (14 episodes)
James Westmoreland as Ruel Jaxon (12 episodes)
Robert Middleton as Barney Wales (6 episodes)
Buck Taylor as John "Brad" Bradford (4 episodes)
James Brolin as Dalton Wales (4 episodes)

Production
The series was produced by Qualis in association with 20th Century Fox Television.  Filming took place on location in Jackson Hole, Wyoming as well as Century City, California.

Home media
The Monroes was first released on DVD by Shout! Factory on September 6, 2016.  The DVD set includes all 26 original episodes from the series' single broadcast season.  The product was initially released exclusively in Walmart stores, but was later made widely available.

Episodes

References

External links 

 
 

1966 American television series debuts
1967 American television series endings
American Broadcasting Company original programming
Television series by 20th Century Fox Television
Television shows set in Wyoming
1960s Western (genre) television series